Terrys Creek, an urban watercourse that is part of the Lane Cove River catchment, is located in Northern Suburbs region of Sydney, Australia. It was named after Edward Terry (1840 - 1907) who served as the first mayor of Eastwood municipality.

Course and features

The catchment area has been subject to periodic flooding, most notably in 1967/8, November 1984, and in February 1990 when 174 residents were displaced as a result of rising flood waters. The 1984 flood resulted in flooding of a number of residential properties throughout the catchment, and also resulted in considerable damage and disruption in the  town centre.

Terrys Creek is transversed by the Main North railway line, Epping Road, and the M2 Hills Motorway.

See also 

 Great North Walk
 Great North Road
 Lane Cove National Park
 Rivers of New South Wales

References

External links
  Report includes maps and photos of historical and projected future flood events, together with proposed mitigation strategies.

Creeks and canals of Sydney
Parramatta River
City of Parramatta
City of Ryde
Hornsby Shire